Cyperus svensonii is a species of sedge that is native to parts of Central America and northern parts of South America.

See also 
 List of Cyperus species

References 

svensonii
Plants described in 1986
Flora of Mexico
Flora of Ecuador
Flora of Guatemala
Flora of Honduras
Flora of Nicaragua